The men's team accuracy competition at the 2018 Asian Games in Puncak, Bogor Regency, Indonesia was held from 20 August to 22 August at the Gunung Mas.

If any team had less than five competitors, then a maximum score of 500 was awarded to the team for each task for each of the scores for which there is no competitor.

Schedule 
All times are Western Indonesia Time (UTC+07:00)

Results

References

External links 
Rowing at the 2018 Asian Games

Paragliding at the 2018 Asian Games